The butterfly theorem is a classical result in Euclidean geometry, which can be stated as follows:

Proof

A formal proof of the theorem is as follows:
Let the perpendiculars   and  be dropped from the point  on the straight lines  and  respectively. Similarly, let  and  be dropped from the point  perpendicular to the straight lines  and  respectively.

Since 
 
 

 
 

 
 

 

From the preceding equations and the intersecting chords theorem, it can be seen that

 

 

 

 

 

since .

So

Cross-multiplying in the latter equation,

Cancelling the common term

from both sides of the resulting equation yields

hence , since MX, MY, and PM are all positive, real numbers.

Other proofs exist, including one using projective geometry.

History
Proving the butterfly theorem was posed as a problem by William Wallace in The Gentlemen's Mathematical Companion (1803). Three solutions were published in 1804, and in 1805 Sir William Herschel posed the question again in a letter to Wallace. Rev. Thomas Scurr asked the same question again in 1814 in the Gentlemen's Diary or Mathematical Repository.

References

External links

 The Butterfly Theorem at cut-the-knot
 A Better Butterfly Theorem at cut-the-knot
 Proof of Butterfly Theorem at PlanetMath
 The Butterfly Theorem  by Jay Warendorff, the Wolfram Demonstrations Project.
 

Euclidean plane geometry
Theorems about circles
Articles containing proofs